The locality Tavani (TA-vuh-nee) was a mining settlement and trading post in the Kivalliq Region of Nunavut, Canada.

History
Tavani was established in the summer of 1928 by Dominion Explorers Limited, a mineral exploration company, who used it as an aerial base for prospecting activity along the Hudson Bay coastline. Guy Blanchet, party leader, overwintered at the base in 1928/1929. Dominion Explorers sold the buildings to the Hudson's Bay Company in the fall of 1929, moving its aerial base to Baker Lake and other areas of the north.

Geology
The precambrian geology of Tavani, nearby Marble Island, and Chesterfield Inlet are described by Tella in a 1986 Geological Survey of Canada report.

See also
 List of communities in Nunavut

References

External links
 Map

Ghost towns in Nunavut
Mining communities in Nunavut
Former populated places in the Kivalliq Region
Hudson's Bay Company trading posts in Nunavut